Joaquín Cisneros Fernández (born 25 May 1941) is a Mexican lawyer and politician affiliated with the Institutional Revolutionary Party. As of 2014 he served as Senator of the LVIII and LIX Legislatures of the Mexican Congress representing Tlaxcala and as Deputy of the LVI Legislature.

References

1941 births
Living people
People from Tlaxcala City
20th-century Mexican lawyers
Members of the Senate of the Republic (Mexico)
Members of the Chamber of Deputies (Mexico)
Institutional Revolutionary Party politicians
21st-century Mexican politicians
Politicians from Tlaxcala
National Autonomous University of Mexico alumni
Municipal presidents in Tlaxcala
20th-century Mexican politicians